William Dell Lindsley (December 25, 1812 – March 11, 1890) was a one-term U.S. Representative from Ohio from 1853 to 1855.

Biography

Born in New Haven, Connecticut, Lindsley attended the common schools.
He moved to Buffalo, New York, in 1832 and soon after to Erie County, Ohio, settling near Sandusky.
He engaged in agricultural pursuits.
He served as captain in the Ohio Militia from 1840 to 1843 and as brigadier general in 1843.

Congress 
Lindsley was elected as a Democrat to the Thirty-third Congress (March 4, 1853 – March 3, 1855).
He was an unsuccessful candidate for reelection in 1854 to the Thirty-fourth Congress. He resumed agricultural pursuits.

Death
He died in Perkins Township, Ohio, March 11, 1890. He was interred in Oakland Cemetery, Sandusky, Ohio.

Sources

1812 births
1890 deaths
Politicians from New Haven, Connecticut
People from Sandusky, Ohio
American militia generals
19th-century American politicians
Democratic Party members of the United States House of Representatives from Ohio